Lick Log Creek is a stream in the U.S. state of Rabun County, Georgia. It is a tributary to the Chattooga River.

Lick Log Creek was named for a salty log which attracted cattle. The creek is 9 miles away from Lick Log Mountain.

References

Rivers of Georgia (U.S. state)
Rivers of Rabun County, Georgia